EHT may refer to:

 Earlington Heights station, of the Miami-Dade County Metrorail in Florida
 Eicosanoyl-5-hydroxytryptamide, a dietary supplement
 Egg Harbor Township, New Jersey, United States 
 Euro Hockey Tour, ice hockey tournament 
 Event Horizon Telescope, array of radio telescopes
 Extra high tension, in electrical supply 
 Seattle head tax, a proposed tax in Seattle, United States